Xesús Miguel "Suso" de Toro Santos (born 10 January 1956) is a Spanish writer. A modern and contemporary arts graduate, he has published more than twenty novels and plays in Galician. He is a television scriptwriter and regular contributor to the press and radio. Suso de Toro writes in Galician and sometimes translates his own work into Spanish.

His works have been translated into several languages, and have been taught in European universities.  There are plans to make three of his works into films: A Sombra Cazadora, Non Volvas, and Calzados Lola.

Works
 Caixón desastre (1983)
 Polaroid (1986)
 Land Rover (1988)
 Ambulancia (1990)
 Tic-tac (1993)
 A Sombra Cazadora (1994) Edicións Xerais
 Conta Saldada (1996)
 Unha Rosa é unha Rosa (1997), theater
 Calzados Lola (1997)
 Círculo (1998)
 Non Volvas (2000) Edicións Xerais
 Trece badaladas (2002)
 El príncipe manco (2004)
 Morgun (2004)
 Home sen nome (2006)
 Sete Palabras (2009) Edicións Xerais; self-translated as Siete Palabras (2010) Alianza Editorial

Journalism
 Parado na tormenta (1996)
 Eterno retorno (1996)
 O país da brétema (2000)
 A carreira do salmón (2001)
 Nunca mais Galiza á intemperie (2002)
 Españois todos: As cartas sobre a mesa (2004)
 Ten que doer: literatura e identidade (2004)
 Outra idea de España: Mar de fondo (2005)
 Madera de Zapatero (2005)
 Outra Galiza (2008)

Awards
 Premio da Crítica Galicia
 Premio da Crítica de narrativa galega (twice)
 Premio Blanco Amor
 Premio Nacional de Narrativa

References

External links

Interview in El Mundo
Suso de Toro's blog
Los Laberintos Del Sentido, lecture given in Buenos Aires (PDF)
conocer el autor

1956 births
Living people
Spanish male writers
People from Santiago de Compostela